The Vase of Entemena is a tripod type silver vase and was named after Entemena, the ruler of Lagash.

The vase was recovered in Telloh in 1888 at the site of ancient Shirpurla by Ernest de Sarzec. It was donated to the Louvre by Sultan Abdul Hamid II in 1896 and was thought to be one of the oldest surviving examples of engraving on metal.

The vase is believed to be dedicated to the war god Ningirsu.

The legs of the vase are made of copper. On the surface of the vase lightly engraved, is an image of Anzud the lion-headed eagle, grasping two lions with his talons.

In 1910, Leonard William King described this vase as "the finest example of Sumerian metal work yet recovered."

See also 
 Sumerian King List

References

External links 
 Vase dédié par Entemena, roi de Lagash, au dieu Ningirsu – Louvre

Sumerian art and architecture
Individual vases